Evert Lindgren (26 February 1938 – 20 June 2007) was a Swedish gymnast. He competed in seven events at the 1968 Summer Olympics.

References

1938 births
2007 deaths
Swedish male artistic gymnasts
Olympic gymnasts of Sweden
Gymnasts at the 1968 Summer Olympics
Sportspeople from Gothenburg